Yehudi Wyner (born June 1, 1929, in Calgary, Alberta) is an American composer, pianist, conductor and music educator.

Life and career
Wyner, who grew up in New York City, was raised in a musical family. His father, Lazar Weiner, was an eminent composer of Yiddish art songs. Wyner attended Juilliard, Yale and Harvard, and was a student of Paul Hindemith and Walter Piston. He has written music in a variety of genres, including compositions for orchestra, chamber ensembles, solo voice and solo instruments, as well as theatrical music and settings of the Jewish liturgy. Among his best-known works are the Friday Evening Service (1963) and "Torah Service with Instruments" (1966)
for cantor and chorus, and On This Most Voluptuous Night (1982) for soprano and chamber ensemble.

Wyner taught for 14 years at Yale, where he was the head of the composition faculty. He also taught at SUNY Purchase, Cornell, Brandeis and Harvard.

In 2006, Wyner won the Pulitzer Prize for Music for his piano concerto Chiavi in Mano.

Personal life
Wyner was married to Nancy Braverman (Wyner) from 1951 to 1966, with whom he had three children – Isaiah, Adam, and Cassia.  He married soprano Susan Davenny-Wyner in 1967.

He graduated from Yale University and Harvard University.

Selected works
Partita – for piano, (1952)
Concert duo for violin and piano (1956)
Serenade for flute, horn, trumpet, trombone, viola, cello, piano (1958)
"Torah Service with Instruments" (1966)
The Mirror (1972–73)
Intermedio – Lyric ballet for soprano and strings – October 1974
The Grass is High – for voice and piano (1979)
String quartet (1984–85)
Composition for viola and piano (1987)
Trapunto Junction for trumpet, French horn, trombone and percussion
Amadeus' billiard: for violin, viola, bass, bassoon and two horns (cf. Mozart—Divertimento no. 7, K. 205) (1991)
Prologue and narrative: for cello and orchestra (1994)
Horntrio (1997)
The second madrigal: Voices of women (1999)
Quartet for oboe and string trio (1999)
Commedia: for clarinet in B-flat and piano (2003)
Chiavi in Mano for piano and orchestra (2004)
Give Thanks for All Things for orchestra and chorus (2010)

Degrees
Yale University, M.Mus. (1953)
Harvard University, M.A. (1952)
Yale University, B.Mus. (1951)
Yale University, B.A. (1950)
Juilliard School, Diploma (1946)

Awards
Fellow, American Academy of Arts and Sciences (2008)
Pulitzer Prize in Music for "Piano Concerto: 'Chiavi in Mano'" (2006)
Member, American Academy of Arts and Letters (2001–2002)
Elise L. Stoeger Prize, Chamber Music Society of Lincoln Center "for contributions to chamber music" (1997–1998)
Finalist, Pulitzer Prize in Music (1997–1998)
Naumburg Chair in Composition (1991)
Guggenheim Fellowship (1976–1977)
National Endowment for the Arts grant (1976)
Brandeis University Creative Arts Award (1963)
National Institute of Arts and Letters grant (1961)
Guggenheim Fellowship (1960)
A.E. Hertz Fellowship (1953)
Rome Prize Fellowship (1953–1956)

Notable students
Chester Biscardi
Craig Walsh

Partial discography
YEHUDI WYNER: 'CHIAVI IN MANO,' OTHER WORKS. Robert Levin, pianist; Boston Symphony Orchestra, conducted by Robert Spano; other performers. Bridge 9282; CD,

References

Composer's homepage
Biography from the Milken Archive of American Jewish Music
Biography from Schirmer Inc. Associated Music Publishers
Faculty profile from Brandeis University

External links
 Hear Yehudi Wyner in concert from WGBH Boston
 Interview with Yehudi Wyner, December 19, 1994

1929 births
Living people
American male classical composers
American classical composers
American classical pianists
Male classical pianists
American male pianists
American male conductors (music)
Canadian emigrants to the United States
Jewish classical musicians
Jewish American classical composers
Musicians from Calgary
Musicians from New York City
Pulitzer Prize for Music winners
Yale University faculty
Harvard University faculty
Brandeis University faculty
Pupils of Paul Hindemith
20th-century American pianists
Harvard University alumni
Yale University alumni
20th-century American conductors (music)
21st-century American conductors (music)
Presidents of the American Academy of Arts and Letters